O Bolo is a municipality in Ourense in the Galicia region of north-west Spain. It is located towards the north-east of the province.

References

External links
Ayuntamiento de El Bollo in Spanish.
Concello de O Bolo in Galician.

Municipalities in the Province of Ourense